Paul Schütte (born 10 March 1989) is an Irish sportsperson.  He plays hurling with his local club Cuala and has been a member of the Dublin senior inter-county team since 2011.

Honours
Dublin
National Hurling League (1): 2011
Leinster Senior Hurling Championship (1): 2013
Leinster Under-21 Hurling Championship (2): 2010
Leinster Minor Hurling Championship (1): 2007

References

1989 births
Living people
Cuala hurlers
Dublin inter-county hurlers
People from Dalkey
Sportspeople from Dún Laoghaire–Rathdown